Bathytoma boholica is a species of sea snail, a marine gastropod mollusk in the family Borsoniidae.

Distribution
This species occurs off the Philippines.

Description
The length of the shell varies between 40 mm and 70 mm. It is spiral shaped with brown stripes. Not much is known about the snail.

References

 Manfred Parth, .Eine neue auffällige Turriden-Art von den Philippinen (Mollusca, Gastropoda, Turridae); Spixiana Bd. 17 (1994)

External links
 

boholica
Gastropods described in 1994